Eugenia cyrtophylloides is a species of plant in the family Myrtaceae. It is endemic to Peninsular Malaysia.

References

cyrtophylloides
Endemic flora of Peninsular Malaysia
Vulnerable plants
Taxonomy articles created by Polbot